The men's singles tennis event at the 2022 Pacific Mini Games took place at the American Memorial Park and Pacific Islands Club in Saipan, Northern Mariana Islands from 19 to 24 June 2022.

Northern Mariana's Colin Sinclair defeated Papua New Guinea's Matthew Stubbings, 6–0, 6–1, to win the gold medal in Men's Singles tennis at the 2022 Pacific Mini Games. In the bronze medal match, Fiji's William O'Connell beat Tahiti's Gillian Osmont, 6–2, 77–63.

Schedule

Seeds
All seeds per ATP rankings.

Results

Finals

Top-half

Section 1

Section 2

Section 3

Section 4

Bottom half

Section 5

Section 6

Section 7

Section 8

References

External links
Official website

2022 Pacific Mini Games
Pacific Games
Tennis
2022 in Northern Mariana Islands sports
2022 in tennis
International sports competitions hosted by the Northern Mariana Islands